Events from the year 1882 in Scotland.

Incumbents

Law officers 
 Lord Advocate – John Blair Balfour
 Solicitor General for Scotland – Alexander Asher

Judiciary 
 Lord President of the Court of Session and Lord Justice General – Lord Glencorse
 Lord Justice Clerk – Lord Moncreiff

Events 
 2 March – Roderick Maclean fails in an attempt to assassinate Queen Victoria at Windsor, Berkshire.
 1 June – Rothesay tramway opened on the Isle of Bute; a salt-water swimming bath is also opened in Rothesay this year.
 June – St. Andrew's Ambulance Association is officially founded with a constitution being adopted at a general meeting in Glasgow.
 July – HM Prison Barlinnie opened in Glasgow.
 27 November – Inverythan rail accident: a cast iron girder underbridge in Aberdeenshire collapses as a Great North of Scotland Railway train passes over, causing at least 5 deaths.
 20 December – Hospital for Sick Children, Glasgow, opened at Garnethill.
 Battle of the Braes on Skye: Protests by crofting tenants facing eviction. Police from Glasgow and the military are sent to restore order.
 Vat 69 blended whisky first produced by William Sanderson & Son of South Queensferry.
 Founding of Albion Rovers F.C. through the amalgamation of two Coatbridge clubs, Albion and Rovers.
 Lewis Campbell publishes The Life of James Clerk Maxwell, with a Selection from his Correspondence and Occasional Writings and a Sketch of his Contributions to Science, including some of Maxwell's verses.
 Archaeologist Robert Munro publishes Ancient Scottish Lake Dwellings or Crannogs.

Births 
 6 January – Alexander Gray, economist, poet and translator (died 1968)
 2 February – Joseph Wedderburn, mathematician (died 1948)
 20 February – Alexander Carrick, sculptor (died 1966)
 24 April – Hugh Dowding, Air Chief Marshal (died 1970)
 28 May – Donald McLeod, footballer (killed 1917 in Battle of Passchendaele)
 16 June – Norah Neilson Gray, portrait painter (died 1931)
 18 June – Thomas S. Tait, architect (died 1954)
 8 July – John Anderson, 1st Viscount Waverley, civil servant and politician (died 1958)
 John Alexander Stewart, orientalist (died 1948)

Deaths 
 17 January – Sir Daniel Macnee, portrait painter (born 1806)
 23 January – Robert Christison, toxicologist, physician and president of the British Medical Association (1875) (born 1797)
 7 March – John Muir, Indologist (born 1810)
 10 March – Sir Charles Wyville Thomson, marine zoologist (born 1830)
 11 May – John Brown, physician and writer (born 1810)

The arts
 American scholar Francis James Child begins publication of The English and Scottish Popular Ballads, the Child Ballads.
 Gaelic poet William Livingston (Uilleam Macdhunleibhe)'s collected works are published posthumously as Duain agus Orain.

See also 
 Timeline of Scottish history
 1882 in the United Kingdom

References 

 
Years of the 19th century in Scotland
Scotland
1880s in Scotland